The Canada cricket team toured West Indies on 13 April 2010. They played a single One Day International at Sabina Park, Kingston, Jamaica where they lost by 208 runs.

Only ODI

2010 in Canadian sports
2010 in West Indian cricket
2009–10 West Indian cricket season
Canadian cricket tours of the West Indies
International cricket competitions in 2009–10